Milleriana is a monotypic genus of grasshoppers in the subfamily Catantopinae and tribe unassigned, containing the species M. brunnea Willemse, 1957, which can be found in 
Peninsular Malaysia.

References

External Links 
 

Acrididae genera
Catantopinae 
Orthoptera of Asia
Monotypic Orthoptera genera